Iwno  is a hamlet in the administrative district of Gmina Goleniów, within Goleniów County, West Pomeranian Voivodeship, in north-western Poland.

For the history of the region, see History of Pomerania.

The settlement was founded as a colony owners Lubczyny - Borgstade family in 1805.

Currently, a hamlet is located within the village Lubczyna. Iwno land lies along the road connecting the Rurzyca - Lubczyna. There are two houses, farm, and old water pump. Hamlet is surrounded by meadows and wetlands.

References

Iwno
1805 establishments in Prussia